= Yowa Mabinda Kapinga Mbemba =

Congolese politician

Yowa Mabinda Kapinga Mbemba is a Congolese politician.

Yowa Mabinda Kapinga was the Commissioner of Culture & Fine Arts for Zaire.
